Malm may refer to:

Places
Malm, a village in the municipality of Verran in Trøndelag county, Norway
Malm (municipality), a former municipality in the old Nord-Trøndelag county, Norway
Malmi, Helsinki, a district of Helsinki, Finland
Malmi, Pyhtää, a village in Pyhtää, Finland

Other uses
Malm (geology), a name indicating rocks of Late Jurassic age
Malm (surname)
Master Air Loadmaster (MALM), a rank in the Royal Air Force